Robyn Crawford (born December 17, 1960) is an American author, producer, and former assistant to and creative director for Whitney Houston. Her credits include The Bodyguard (1992),  Waiting to Exhale (1995), In Between (1987), and  The Wonderful World of Disney (1995).

Early life
Crawford was born in Newark, New Jersey, but grew up as one of three siblings in East Orange, New Jersey. Crawford's mother left her father due to his abuse. Both her mother, Janet Crawford, and her brother, Marty, were diagnosed with HIV. They both died of AIDS related illness in the ’90s.

Relationship with Whitney Houston
Crawford met Whitney Houston in 1980, when Crawford was 19 and Houston was 16, the pair having both been counselors at an East Orange summer camp.

Crawford claims in her book A Song for You: My Life with Whitney Houston, published in 2019, that she had a same-sex relationship with Houston that faded as they prioritized Houston's career. Crawford left school to aid Houston's career. They lived together as a couple. Crawford was ostracised and sidelined by Houston's family and management as Houston's fame grew and her career progressed, and she married Bobby Brown.

Her book A Song for You: My Life with Whitney Houston became a New York Times Best Seller.

Personal life
Crawford lives in New Jersey with her wife Lisa Hintelmann, with whom she adopted twins. Lena Waithe has cited Crawford as an early inspiration.

Filmography

In print
Oprah Magazine
The Advocate
Essence

Podcasts

Bibliography
 A Song for You My Life With Whitney Houston. Dutton. 2019. .

References

1960 births
American women memoirists
American memoirists
Writers from East Orange, New Jersey
American LGBT writers
LGBT people from New Jersey
LGBT memoirists
Living people
21st-century African-American women
21st-century American women